Colin Beavan (born 1963) is an American non-fiction writer and internet blogger noted for recording the attempts of his family to live a "zero impact" lifestyle in New York City for one year.

Zero impact experiment
The rules of the experiment included: producing no trash, save for compost, purchasing no goods except for food grown within a 250-mile radius, using no carbon-based transportation, and using no paper products, including toilet paper. He and his family are the subject of a documentary, No Impact Man: The Documentary. A book about the year-long experiment was released in September 2009.

Writing career
Beavan was named one of MSN's Ten Most Influential Men of 2007 and was named an Eco-Illuminator in Elle magazine's 2008 Green Awards. His blog NoImpactMan.com was named one of the world's top 15 environmental websites by Time. He has written for numerous American magazines, including The Atlantic and Wired.

Political career
In May 2012, Beavan announced he would run for the United States House of Representatives seat representing New York's 8th congressional district, running as the nominee of the Green Party. Beavan lost the general election to Hakeem Jeffries, a member of the New York State Assembly.

Personal life
During the filming of No Impact Man, Colin lived in New York City with his wife Michelle and their daughter. They've since divorced, but remain supportive of each other in co-parenting their daughter.

His books

See also
 Conservation (ethic)
 Individual and political action on climate change
 Sustainable living

References

External links

Votecolin.com - 2012 congressional candidate website
No-Impact Man - The blog about the experience
"Advice From an Accidental Activist"
Beavan discusses Operation Jedburgh: D-Day and America's First Shadow War at the Pritzker Military Museum & Library

American male bloggers
American bloggers
American environmentalists
21st-century American memoirists
American social sciences writers
1963 births
Living people
Simple living advocates
Environmental bloggers
New York (state) Greens